The 1996 Argentine Grand Prix was a Formula One motor race held on 7 April 1996 at Autódromo Oscar Alfredo Gálvez, Buenos Aires. Despite suffering a bout of food poisoning, Damon Hill made it three wins out of three, with Jacques Villeneuve helping Williams complete their second one-two of the season. Jos Verstappen scored his only point of the season, Andrea Montermini his only finish of the season. This was the first race of 1996 where no drivers failed to meet the 107% time.

Pedro Diniz was involved in two major incidents during the race. First he collided with Luca Badoer, whose Forti was flipped and landed upside down in the gravel, forcing the marshals to bring out the safety car. Trackside marshals were heavily criticized for their delay in aiding Badoer's escape from the car; ultimately the Italian was forced to crawl out from underneath the Forti (the explanation for which was later given by the marshals that an uncharacteristic delay in the safety car picking up the race leader had caused confusion on the trackside). Diniz managed to continue and made a pit stop as the safety car was preparing to pull in - only to retire when he came back onto the circuit and his Ligier burst into flames, because a safety-valve in the fuel tank had jammed open, with the safety car staying out for three extra laps as a result.

Classification

Qualifying

Race

Championship standings after the race

Drivers' Championship standings

Constructors' Championship standings

 Note: Only the top five positions are included for both sets of standings.

References

Argentine Grand Prix
Argentine Grand Prix
Grand Prix
Argentine Grand Prix